La venexiana (internationally released as  The Venetian Woman) is a 1986 Italian erotic film directed by Mauro Bolognini. The film is a transposition of the anonymous 16th century comedy play La Venexiana.

Cast 
Laura Antonelli as Angela
Monica Guerritore as Valeria
Jason Connery as Jules
Clelia Rondinella as Nena
Claudio Amendola as Bernardo
Annie Belle

References

External links 
 

1986 films
Films directed by Mauro Bolognini
Films set in Venice
Italian erotic films
Films scored by Ennio Morricone
1980s Italian-language films
1980s Italian films